SBB GmbH, also known as SBB Deutschland, is a railway company that operates services in Germany and the cantons of Basel-City and Schaffhausen in Switzerland. It is a subsidiary of Swiss Federal Railways, the state railway company of Switzerland. It operates various S-Bahn services in Baden-Württemberg near the border with Switzerland, some of which service stations in Switzerland.

History 
Swiss Federal Railways founded the original SBB GmbH in 2002 to operate the S5 and S6 services of the Basel S-Bahn. That company was based in Lörrach, near Basel.

In addition to the Seehas and Basel S-Bahn services, the company began operating the  service between Erzingen and Schaffhausen in 2018, and between Singen (Hohentwiel) and Schaffhausen in 2022.

Operations 
As of December 2022, SBB GmbH operates the following services:

 Basel S-Bahn:
 : 
 

Rolling stock 
SBB GmbH owns 20 Stadler FLIRT multiple units and 4 Stadler GTW 2/6 railcars.

References

External links 

 

Railway companies established in 2005
Railway companies of Germany
German companies established in 2005